Carlos Herrera y Luna (26 October 1856 – 3 July 1930) was a Guatemalan politician who served as acting President of Guatemala from 30 March 1920 to 15 September 1920, and President of Guatemala from 16 September 1920 until 10 December 1921.

Biography

Business 

Herrera Luna was a successful sugar business man, developing Pantaleón Sugar Mill in Santa Lucía Cotzumalguapa, and Concepción and El Baúl sugar mills in Escuintla in the early 1900s. Pantaleón Sugar Holdings is today one of the top 10 sugar companies in America, with mills in Central and South America.

Presidency 

After Manuel Estrada Cabrera was overthrown on April 14, 1920, the Unionist Party leaders, who were mostly conservatives, dealt with the liberal leaders from the Cabrera's regime such that they could appoint the new cabinet.  However, the liberal leaders outsmarted the conservatives and appoint Herrera Luna in office, in spite that he had served as a liberal representative for the whole 22 years that Estrada Cabrera's government lasted; furthermore, they also appointed several key members of the ousted government in the new administration. Under these circumstances, the deals that Estrada Cabrera had set with the United Fruit Company were sure to hold.  However, as an experienced business man, Herrera Luna realized that all of those concessions granted too much power to UFCO without any real benefit for Guatemala in return and did not accept them.

Education 

Herrera Luna granted several benefits to the National University after its valuable contributions to the revolution against Estrada Cabrera's regime:

 Autonomy to elect authorities
 A house for the students to assemble and create their Student Body.

Coup d'état 

Herrera was deposed in a coup, led by José María Orellana, in December 1921 after Herrera resisted to approve the concessions granted to the United Fruit Company and its subsidiaries by his predecessor, Manuel Estrada Cabrera. He subsequently went into exile in France.

See also
History of Guatemala
Presidents of Guatemala
Manuel Estrada Cabrera
United Fruit Company

References

Bibliography

External links

1856 births
1930 deaths
Presidents of Guatemala
Vice presidents of Guatemala
Leaders ousted by a coup
Unionist Party (Guatemala) politicians
Manuel Estrada Cabrera
Guatemalan exiles